The 2010–11 Fenerbahçe S.K. season was the club's 53rd consecutive season in the Süper Lig and their 103rd year in existence. They also competed for a short while in the UEFA Champions League, eliminated in the third qualifying round. On 22 May, 2011, Fenerbahçe won 18th Turkish league title, but refused entry to next season's UEFA Champions League due to match-fixing.

News
On 20 May, 2010, started sales for combined cards. On 10 June, 2010, Miroslav Stoch joined the club from Chelsea. On 25 June, Christoph Daum was fired as head coach; Aykut Kocaman was named his replacement. On 21 July, Fenerbahçe played rivals Galatasaray in the Spor Toto Dostluk Kupası, hosted at the Borussia-Park in Mönchengladbach, Germany, with Fenerbahçe winning 1–9. Also on 21 July, Senagalese loser Issiar Dia joined the club from French side Nancy.

Kits
Fenerbahçe's 2010–11 kits, manufactured by Adidas, were introduced on 23 July, 2010, at the Şükrü Saracoğlu Stadium. The home kit was named "Çubuklu Forma", or "Barred Kit" in English; the away kit was named "Kanarya Forma", meaning "Canary Kit"; the third kit was named "Fenerbahçe Güneşi", meaning "Sun of Fenerbahçe"; and the fourth kit was named "Palamut Forma", meaning "Acorn Kit".

Supplier: Adidas
Main sponsor: Avea

Back sponsor: Ülker
Sleeve sponsor: Türk Telekom

Short sponsor: –
Socks sponsor: –

Transfers

In 

Total spending:  €22 million

Out 

Total income:  N/A

First-team squad

Out on loan

Squad statistics

Club

Board of directors

Technical staff

Medical staff

Pre-season friendlies

Competitions

Süper Lig

League table

Results summary

Results by round

Matches

Türkiye Kupası

Group C

UEFA Champions League

Third Qualifying Round

UEFA Europa League

Play-off Round

See also
2010–11 Süper Lig
2010–11 Türkiye Kupası
2010–11 UEFA Champions League
2010–11 UEFA Europa League

References

External links

2010–11 Fenerbahçe S.K. season Full Results

Fenerbahçe S.K. (football) seasons
Fenerbahce
Turkish football championship-winning seasons